Charles Henry Pascoe (23 December 1876 – 26 January 1957) was an English cricketer.  Pascoe's batting style is unknown, though it is known he was a slow left-arm orthodox bowler.

Background
Pascoe was born at Haggerston, Middlesex. He died at Walthamstow, Essex, on 26 January 1957.

Cricket career
Pascoe made a single first-class appearance for Essex against Leicestershire at Aylestone Road, Leicester, in the 1909 County Championship.  Essex won the toss and elected to bat, making 213 in their first-innings, during which Pascoe ended not out on 3.  Leicestershire responded in their first-innings by making 157 all out, during which Pascoe bowled two wicketless overs.  In their second-innings, Essex made 100/6 declared, with Pascoe not being called upon to bat.  Leicestershire reached 39/1 in their second-innings, before the match was declared a draw.

Pascoe's home club was Ilford Cricket Club.

References

External links
Charles Pascoe at CricketArchive

1876 births
1957 deaths
People from Hackney Central
English cricketers
Essex cricketers